Karamchand is an Indian detective TV series telecast in June 1985. It was broadcast on India's national television channel DD1, and was one of India's first detective series. The title character was played by noted actor Pankaj Kapur. The role of his assistant Kitty was played by Sushmita Mukherjee. Famous music director duo Anand–Milind composed the theme music and title track for the series.

Plot
Karamchand is a detective who helps the local police solve murders in his inimitable style, always munching on carrots and often playing chess with the Police inspector A. Khan. He has a funny assistant, Kitty. And whenever she asks a silly question, or almost reveals the secret, Karamchand says, "Shut up, Kitty".

Cast
Season 1
Pankaj Kapur - Karamchand
Sushmita Mukherjee / Archana Puran Singh - Kitty

Season 2
Pankaj Kapur - Karamchand
Sucheta Khanna - Kitty
Atul Parchure - Inspector Khan
 Rakesh Shrivastav - constable Shrivastav

Revival
Sony Entertainment Television revived this serial in 2006. Pankaj Kapur reprised his role as the carrot chewing Karamchand while Kitty was played by Sucheta Khanna. The second version of the program aired on Saturdays at 9:00 PM.

In other media
In response to Leonard's detective novel, Rajesh Koothrapali mentioned Karamchand in Season 11, Episode 15 of The Big Bang Theory episode "The Novelization Correlation."

References

External links

Sony Entertainment Television original programming
Indian crime television series
Detective television series
DD National original programming
1980s Indian television series
1985 Indian television series debuts
2007 Indian television series endings
Television series revived after cancellation